Rhodotorulic acid is the smallest of the 2,5-diketopiperazine family of hydroxamate siderophores which are high-affinity chelating agents for ferric iron, produced by bacterial and fungal phytopathogens for scavenging iron from the environment.  It is a tetradentate ligand, meaning it binds one iron atom in four locations (two hydroxamate and two lactam moieties), and forms Fe2(siderophore)3 complexes to fulfill an octahedral coordination for iron.

Rhodotorulic acid occurs in basidiomycetous yeasts and was found to retard the spore germination of the fungus Botrytis cinerea. In combination with yeast R. glutinis it was found to be effective in the biocontrol of iprodione-resistant B. cinerea of apple wounds caused by the disease.

References 

Hydroxamic acids
Piperazines
Siderophores
Diketopiperazines